A Taiwanese Tale of Two Cities is a 2018 Mandarin-language TV series of 20 episodes starring Tammy Chen, Peggy Tseng and James Wen. The plot revolves around a Taipei doctor and a San Francisco engineer who swap homes with each other in a pact, and its consequences.

The story is based on the arrangements of a Taiwanese girl living in Dadaocheng, Taipei, Taiwan and a Taiwanese girl who grew up in San Francisco, California, United States. From two perspectives, they depict contemporary people's attitudes and life perspective, presenting sparks of different cultures.

It was released on September 1, 2018 on Taiwanese Public Television Service.

Cast
 Tammy Chen as Lee Nien-Nien
 Peggy Tseng as Josephine Huang
 James Wen as Teng Tien-Ming
 Lung Shao-hua as Lee Jen-Kuei
 Denny Huang as Ryan Yeh
 Poh-Shiang Lee as Hsiao-Meng
 Yi-Wen Yen as Wu Ching-Wen
 Yang Li-yin as Amy Chen
 Mei-Ling Lo as Floss
 Wanfang as Chien-Hui

Release
A Taiwanese Tale of Two Cities was released on September 1, 2018 on Taiwanese Public Television Service alongside Netflix outside Taiwan. The series was aired the next day on Formosa Television, which is also where the series was aired it again in 2020. Both PTS & Formosa TV airing was only available on the linear TV (both terrestrial and cable TV), meaning that online TV airing was not available other than Taiwan Mobile's myVideo and Netflix.

Soundtrack
Love Yourself by Wanfang (Opening Theme)
Make Me Listen by Holly Lou
Never the Point by The Empire (Closing Theme)
No Regrets, Only Love (沒遺憾，只有愛) by Rose Liu (Closing Theme on second airing)
The Ripples by Tommy Ljungberg
21st Century Jam by terrytyelee
Bottom Line Acoustic ver. (底線 Acoustic) by Julia Wu
Blue Magic Sunday by terrytyelee
Life's Thinking About You by Parking Lot Pimp
Uh Huh	by Ape Kao
Turn Up The Night To Music by terrytyelee
You Win This Time (這次算妳贏拉) by terrytyelee
Find A Way by Julia Wu
H.E.N.R.Y by Julia Wu
Marching Forward (向前走) by Lim Giong
Babymama (我孩的媽) by BOi!
Gravity by BOi!
RiDE by BOi! feat. Xina Sui
Call it a day - Tommy Ljungberg (This TV series doesn't put this song on, but still featured it anyway.)

Awards and nominations

References

External links
 
 

2018 Taiwanese television series debuts
2019 Taiwanese television series endings
Public Television Service original programming
Formosa Television original programming
Gala Television original programming
Mandarin-language Netflix original programming
Television shows set in Taiwan
Television shows set in San Francisco